The 2016–17 season was Arsenal Ladies' 7th season in the Women's Super League, 25th season in the top flight, and the 30th season overall. The club participated in the WSL and the FA Cup.

The 2017 WSL season covered only half of a normal season's length, following a reorganisation of top-level women's football in England to shift its schedule to a traditional autumn-to-spring calendar. For this reason there was no WSL Cup, Champions League qualification, or relegation to be competed for.

This was the club's final season known as Arsenal Ladies before rebranding to Arsenal Women in July 2017.

Players

Squad information

Last updated on 2 May 2017

Transfers

Transfers in

Transfers out

Loans out

Pre-season

Friendlies

Testimonials

Competitions

Overview 
{| class="wikitable" style="text-align: center"
|-
!rowspan=2|Competition
!colspan=8|Record
|-
!
!
!
!
!
!
!
!
|-
| Women's Super League

|-
| FA Cup

|-
|-
! Total

Spring Series

Results summary

Results by matchday

Matches

FA Cup

Statistics

Appearances and goals

Players without any appearance are not included.

|-
|colspan="14"|Goalkeepers:
|-

|-
|colspan="14"|Defenders:
|-

|-
|colspan="14"|Midfielders:
|-

|-
|colspan="14"|Forwards:
|-

Goalscorers
Includes all competitive matches. The list is sorted by squad number when total goals are equal.

Clean sheets 
Includes all competitive matches. The list is sorted by squad number when total clean sheets are equal.

Honours

 PFA Special Achievement Award:  Kelly Smith
 2016–17 PFA Team of the Year:  Jordan Nobbs

References

2017
English football clubs 2016–17 season